Jack Turner (born in 1942) is an American writer and academic. He was educated at the University of Colorado and Cornell University and taught philosophy at the University of Illinois. Since 1975, he has traveled in India, Pakistan, Nepal, China, Tibet, Bhutan, Peru, and Patagonia, leading more than forty treks and expeditions. He has lived in Grand Teton National Park for over twenty years and teaches mountaineering during the summers. He is the author of several books and essays. He won a 2007 Whiting Award.

Bibliography
Travels in the Greater Yellowstone. (Jun 12, 2007). . Hardcover.
Traces of an Omnivore, introduction by Jack Turner. (Mar. 1, 2006). . Paperback.
Teewinot: Climbing and Contemplating the Teton Range. (Nov. 10, 2001). . Paperback.
Teewinot: A Year in the Teton Range. (Jun. 8, 2000). . Hardcover.
The Abstract Wild. (Oct. 1996). . Paperback.

External links
Profile at The Whiting Foundation
Exum Mountain Guides

Living people
1942 births
American travel writers
American male non-fiction writers
University of Colorado Boulder alumni
Deep ecologists
Cornell University alumni
University of Illinois Urbana-Champaign faculty